NGC 226 is a spiral galaxy located approximately 216 million light-years from the Sun in the constellation Andromeda. It was discovered on December 21, 1786 by William Herschel.

See also 
 Spiral galaxy 
 List of NGC objects (1–1000)
 Andromeda (constellation)

References

External links 
 
 
 SEDS

0226
2572
Spiral galaxies
Andromeda (constellation)
Astronomical objects discovered in 1786
Discoveries by William Herschel